Willard Miller Huyck Sr. (January 11, 1917 – November 3, 2018) served in the California State Assembly for the 59th district from 1947 to 1951 and during World War II he served in the United States Army. His son is the screenwriter, director and producer Willard Huyck.

References

External links

United States Army personnel of World War II
1917 births
2018 deaths
Republican Party members of the California State Assembly
20th-century American politicians